Gracianella is a genus of fossil brachiopods. It was described by Johnson and Coucot in 1967, and existed from the Silurian to the Devonian of Australia, Austria, Canada, China, the Czech Republic, Italy, Tajikistan, and the United States. A new species, G. paulula, was described by Andrzej Baliński in 2012, from the early Devonian of Ukraine.

References

External links

Prehistoric brachiopod genera
Paleozoic life of the Northwest Territories
Paleozoic life of Nunavut
Paleozoic life of Yukon